Banabar (also Romanized as Banābar) is a village in Qahan Rural District, Khalajastan District, Qom County, Qom Province, Iran. At the 2006 census, its population was 212, in 67 families.

References 

Populated places in Qom Province